Onde means wave in French and the same (ಒಂದೇ) in Kannada language. It may refer to
Onde, Vikramgad, a village in India
Onde Balliya Hoogalu, a 1967 Indian Kannada film
Onde Roopa Eradu Guna, a 1975 Indian Kannada film
Onde Guri, a 1983 Indian Kannada film
Le Onde, a 1996 album by the Italian pianist Ludovico Einaudi
Mille Lune Mille Onde, a single from Andrea Bocelli's 2001 album Cieli di Toscana
Onde (film), a 2005 Italian film
Onde 2000, a motorcycle racing team based in Spain

See also
Ondes (disambiguation)
Onde-onde (disambiguation)